Notre Dame Cemetery, is a Catholic cemetery in Ottawa, Ontario, Canada. Opened in 1872, it is the most prominent Catholic cemetery in Ottawa. The cemetery's western edge is located in Vanier, just south of Beechwood Cemetery. Its eastern limit is St. Laurent Boulevard.  The cemetery is the final resting place for more than 114,000 people.

Notable interments
 Janis Babson (1950–1961), Corneal transplant donor
 Bruno Bitkowski (1929–1966), Football player
 Bobby Boucher (1899–1958), Hockey Player
 E. A. Bourque (1887–1962), Mayor of Ottawa
 Ernie Calcutt (1932–1984), Ottawa Rough Riders announcer and Canadian Football Hall of Fame inductee
 Benjamin Chee Chee (1944–1977), Ojibwe artist
 Alex Connell (1902–1958), Hockey Hall of Fame player
 Aurèle Joliat (1901–1986), Hockey Hall of Fame player
 Yousuf Karsh (1908–2002), Portrait photographer
 Ray Kinsella (1910–1996), Hockey player
 Filip Konowal (1886–1959), World War I hero, awarded the Victoria Cross
 Alan Kuntz (1919–1987), Hockey player
 Sir Wilfrid Laurier (1841–1919), Prime Minister of Canada
 Gerry Lowrey (1906–1979), Hockey player
 Kilby MacDonald (1913–1986), Hockey player
 Jack MacKell (1896–1961), Hockey player
 Champlain Marcil (1920–2010), Photographer
 Louis-Félix Pinault (1852–1906), Statesman
 Silver Quilty (1891–1976), Canadian Football Hall of Fame and Canada's Sports Hall of Fame inductee
 Eldon Rathburn (1916–2008), Film composer
 Larry Regan (1930–2009), Hockey player
 Anna T. Sadlier (1854–1932), Writer
 Alf Smith (1873–1953), Hockey player
 Tommy Smith (1886–1966), Hockey Hall of Fame player

War graves
The cemetery contains the war graves of 115 Commonwealth service personnel, 40 from World War I and 75 from World War II.

References

Bibliography

External links

 

Roman Catholic cemeteries in Canada
Tourist attractions in Ottawa
Commonwealth War Graves Commission cemeteries in Canada
Cemeteries in Ottawa